The 1926 Texas Mines Miners football team, sometimes known as the "Muckers", was an American football team that represented Texas School of Mines (now known as the University of Texas at El Paso) as an independent during the 1926 college football season. In its third and final season under head coach George B. Powell, the team compiled a 3–4 record and outscored opponents by a total of 106 to 92. The team lost its rivalry game with New Mexico A&M by a 10-8 score.

Schedule

References

Texas Mines
UTEP Miners football seasons
Texas Mines Miners football